Turn of the Tide (1935) is a British drama film directed by Norman Walker and starring John Garrick, Geraldine Fitzgerald and Wilfrid Lawson. It was the first feature film made by J. Arthur Rank. Lacking a distributor for his film, Rank set up his own distribution and production company which subsequently grew into his later empire.

The film contains many Whitby registered boats (WY) and contains much documentary-style footage of making and repairing lobster creels.

Plot
The film is set in the fictional Yorkshire fishing village of Bramblewick and relates the rivalry between two fishing families. It is filmed mainly around Robin Hood's Bay (evidenced in the WY identity codes on the fishing boats).

The characters speak in the local Yorkshire accent and dialect. Rivalry between the lobster fishermen begins when one boat is fitted with a new diesel engine. Ropes are cut so the lobsters cannot be retrieved. The feuding comes to an end when a man from one family says he wants to marry a girl from the other family.

The work is based on the 1932 novel Three Fevers by Leo Walmsley.

Cast
 John Garrick as Marney Lunn 
 J. Fisher White as Isaac Fosdyck 
 Geraldine Fitzgerald as Ruth Fosdyck 
 Wilfrid Lawson as Luke Fosdyck 
 Moore Marriott as Tindal Fosdyck 
 Sam Livesey as Henry Lunn 
 Niall MacGinnis as John Lunn 
 Joan Maude as Amy Lunn 
 Derek Blomfield as Steve Lunn 
 Hilda Davies as Mrs. Lunn

Reception
Writing for The Spectator in 1935, Graham Greene remarked that the film was "unpretentious and truthful", and "one of the best English films [he] ha[d] yet seen". Rejecting contemporary critical comparison of the film to Man of Aran, Greene suggested that where Man of Aran had featured sentimentality, Turn of the Tides director "Norman Walker is concerned with truth, [...] and the beauty his picture catches is that of exact statement".

Although the film was originally considered a box-office disappointment it was eventually voted the sixth best British movie of 1936.

Britmovie called it a "refreshingly compassionate drama that benefits from being filmed on location at Robin Hood's Bay and Whitby".

References

External links

Walmsley Society | http://www.walmsleysoc.org/TurnOfTheTide.html

1935 films
British drama films
1930s English-language films
1935 drama films
British black-and-white films
Films about fishing
Films based on British novels
Films set in Yorkshire
Films shot in England
Seafaring films
Films shot at Imperial Studios, Elstree
1930s British films